Big Ideas is an Australian weekly radio program on ABC Radio National which presents lectures or panels on ideas or issues of particular importance. It is also available as a podcast.  it is presented by Paul Barclay, who has presented the program since at least January 2002. 

Until the end of 2014, ABC TV also aired a television edition of Big Ideas, hosted by Waleed Aly.

References

External links

Australian Broadcasting Corporation radio programs